Blow My Fuse is the fourth album by the glam metal band Kix. Released on September 19, 1988, on Atlantic Records, the album features Kix's only hit, the power ballad "Don't Close Your Eyes." The song peaked at No. 11 on the Billboard Hot 100 and was co-written with Bob Halligan, Jr. and Crack the Sky frontman John Palumbo, both of whom had previously collaborated on Kix songs. The album was certified platinum by the RIAA in 2000.

Track listing
Side one
 "Red Lite, Green Lite, TNT" (Donnie Purnell, Steve Whiteman, Jon Reede, Marc Tanner) – 3:54
 "Get It While It's Hot" (Purnell, Philip Brown, John Palumbo) – 4:24
 "No Ring Around Rosie" (Purnell, Taylor Rhodes) – 4:34
 "Don't Close Your Eyes" (Purnell, Bob Halligan Jr., Palumbo) – 4:15
 "She Dropped Me the Bomb" (Purnell, Palumbo) – 3:46

Side two
 "Cold Blood" (Purnell, Rhodes) – 4:16
 "Piece of the Pie" (Purnell, Whiteman, Reede, Tanner) – 3:55
 "Boomerang" (Purnell) – 3:44
 "Blow My Fuse" (Purnell) – 4:00
 "Dirty Boys" (Purnell, Palumbo) – 3:42

Personnel
Kix
Steve Whiteman – lead vocals, harmonica
Ronnie "10/10" Younkins – guitars
Brian "Damage" Forsythe – guitars
Donnie Purnell – bass, keyboards, piano, backing vocals
Jimmy "Chocolate" Chalfant – drums, percussion, backing vocals

Production
Tom Werman – producer on tracks 1, 2, 4, 6, 9, executive producer, mixing
Duane Baron – producer on tracks 3, 5, 6-8, 10, engineer, mixing
John Purdell – producer on tracks 3, 5, 6-8, 10, mixing
Greg Fulginiti – mastering at Artisan Sound Recorders, Hollywood
Bob Defrin – art direction
John Scarpati – photography

Charts

Certifications

References

External links
Kix Official Website
Guitar.com 2014 interview with Kix guitarist Brian Forsythe

1988 albums
Kix (band) albums
Albums produced by John Purdell
Albums produced by Tom Werman
Albums produced by Duane Baron
Atlantic Records albums